Revillagigedo may refer to any of several subjects:

People 
Juan Francisco de Güemes, 1st Count of Revillagigedo, viceroy of New Spain
Juan Vicente de Güemes, 2nd Count of Revillagigedo, also a viceroy of New Spain

Places 
Revillagigedo Channel in Alaska
Revillagigedo Island in Alaska
The Revillagigedo Islands, Pacific islands off the coast of the Mexican state of Colima
All three of these places were named after the 2nd count

The 18th-century Revillagigedo Palace in Gijón, Asturias, Spain

Creatures 
Acanthemblemaria mangognatha, also called the Revillagigedo barnacle blenny or the Revillagigedo barnacle: a seafish native to the Revillagigedo Islands